Ledebour is a surname. Notable people with the surname include:

Carl Friedrich von Ledebour (1786–1851), German-Estonian botanist
Georg Ledebour (1850–1947), German journalist and politician

de:Ledebour